Al-Hamidiyah is a town in Syria.

Al-Hamidiyah or variant spellings may also refer to the following places:

 Al Hamidiyah, Ajman, in the United Arab Emirates
 Al-Hamidiyya, a Palestinian village depopulated in 1948
 Al-Hamidiyah Souq, in Damascus, Syria
 Hamidiyya Higher Secondary School, in Ilaiyangudi, Tamil Nadu, India

See also
 Hamidiye (disambiguation)
 Hamidiyeh (disambiguation)
 Abdul Hamid II, Ottoman Sultan
 Hamidiya, a city in Central District, Yazd County, Yazd Province, Iran
 El Hawamdeya, a city in the Giza Governorate of Egypt